Shanghai Business School is a business school in Shanghai, China. It was formerly the East China Branch of the Tax Administration School of the Central Government of China.

As of 2021, Shanghai Business School ranked 4th in Shanghai after Shanghai University of Finance and Economics, Shanghai University of International Business and Economics, and Shanghai Lixin University of Accounting and Finance and 39th nationwide among universities specialized in finance, business, and economics in the recent edition of the recognized Best Chinese Universities Ranking.

External links
 上海商学院 - 首页
 Shanghai Business School

Notes and references

Universities and colleges in Shanghai
Business schools in China